On January 6, 2017, a mass shooting occurred at Fort Lauderdale–Hollywood International Airport in Broward County, Florida, United States, near the baggage claim in Terminal 2. Five people were killed while six others were injured in the shooting. About 36 people sustained injuries in the ensuing panic. Esteban Santiago-Ruiz, who flew in to the airport from Alaska and committed the shooting with a Walther PPS 9mm semi-automatic pistol, was taken into custody by a Broward County Sheriff's Office (BSO) deputy within 85 seconds after he started shooting. The shooting from start to finish lasted 7080 seconds. Santiago was later diagnosed with schizophrenia and pleaded guilty to avoid possible execution. On August 17, 2018, Santiago was sentenced to five consecutive life sentences plus 120 years in prison.

Attack

On January 6, 2017, at 12:53 p.m. EST, the shooter, who had flown in from Alaska, opened fire with a Walther PPS 9mm semi-automatic pistol in the Fort Lauderdale–Hollywood International Airport. He opened fire in the baggage claim area of Terminal 2, which is the host terminal for Delta Air Lines and Air Canada. He killed five people and injured six others. The shooting lasted 70 to 80 seconds. The shooter had purchased the gun legally, and legally checked it in his luggage. After he stopped shooting, the suspect lay down on the floor.

A nearby Broward County Sheriff's Office (BSO) deputy immediately responded by running to the sound of gunfire, and apprehended the suspect within 85 seconds. The deputy had been trained to react immediately to an active shooter, and said: "I was basically going - reacting ... - what I was trained to do. So I went towards the shooting." The following year, the BSO deputy was named Deputy of the Year by the Florida Sheriffs Association. Other responding BSO officers also reacted in a manner that Special Master J. Dudley Goodlette, who later reviewed the incident, said was "textbook." Broward County Sheriff Scott Israel said that law enforcement officers did not fire shots, and arrested the gunman without further incident. The Special Master found that the shooting "was not preventable by Sheriff Israel or anyone else".

Video showed travelers rushing out of the airport, and hundreds of people waiting on a ramp, as numerous law enforcement officers rushed to the scene.  A brief panic occurred following "unfounded reports of additional gunshots". The false alarm touched off a brief panic in other terminals. Former White House Press Secretary Ari Fleischer tweeted from the airport, "Shots have been fired. Everyone is running."

Aftermath
The Federal Aviation Administration issued a ground stop notice, closing the airport to all but emergency flights. Port Everglades, staffed by the American Red Cross, assisted about 10,000 passengers who were bussed there for food, shelter, and to connect to transportation. The airport remained closed for the remainder of the day, but reopened to commercial flights early the following day. Following the shooting, more than 20,000 pieces of baggage were left at the airport amid the chaos.

President Obama was briefed about the shooting by Assistant to the President for Homeland Security and Counterterrorism Lisa Monaco. President-elect Donald Trump tweeted that he was monitoring the situation and that he had spoken with Florida Governor Rick Scott regarding the shooting. President Obama later consoled the victims and said that he had asked his staff to reach out to Mayor Jack Seiler in order to make sure efforts were coordinated between state and local officials. Scott ordered flags of the United States and of Florida to be flown at half-mast throughout the state on January 7 and 8 to honor the victims.

After the shooting, Sheriff Israel called for a ban on assault rifles to be reinstated, and said that he didn’t believe that people with mental illness should have access to firearms. He said: “All I’m going to do is speak my mind. If I’m on an island, I’m on an island. I’m not going to worry about who is with me or who is not.”

People

Victims
Five people died in the attack, all of whom were passing through Fort Lauderdale to begin cruises with their spouses. The number of people injured due to the shooting was six, with three admitted to intensive care units. The sheriff said that in addition to the people injured by gunshots, about 30 to 40 others were "injured in the panic" during the event.

Perpetrator

Esteban Santiago-Ruiz (born March 16, 1990), a -year-old resident of Alaska, unemployed, and a former Alaska Army National Guard member, was arrested immediately after the shooting.

Santiago flew on a Delta Air Lines flight from Ted Stevens Anchorage International Airport in Alaska, connecting through Minneapolis–Saint Paul International Airport. Investigators say that he  declared a 9mm pistol with two magazines, locked in a secure container, his only checked baggage. He retrieved it in Fort Lauderdale and loaded the gun in the airport bathroom just before the attack. Santiago was reported to be carrying military identification at the time of the shooting. 

Santiago was born in New Jersey in 1990 and moved to Puerto Rico two years later. He lived most of his life in Peñuelas, Puerto Rico, and attended high school there. He joined the Puerto Rico National Guard on December 14, 2007, and served in the Iraq War from April 23, 2010, to February 19, 2011, as a combat engineer. He later served in the Alaska Army National Guard from November 21, 2014, until receiving a general discharge in August 2016 for "unsatisfactory performance." He was a private first class and received ten awards during his time in the military. According to his family members, he had become mentally ill after his tour in Iraq and was severely affected by seeing a bomb explode near two of his friends while in service. They also said he had recently received psychological treatment, which was confirmed by federal officials.

The Puerto Rico Police opened an investigation into his errant behavior and  confiscated his firearms in March 2012. They were, however, returned to him in May 2014. He also obtained a Florida driver's license in August 2012 even though he never lived in Florida, per official records. He provided the license on his successful application for permission to carry a concealed gun in Puerto Rico. He later moved from Puerto Rico to Alaska, along with his brother, in the same year.

While in Alaska, Santiago worked as a security guard for a private company, where he was described as being "quiet and solitary." He became increasingly violent over the following year. In January 2016, Santiago was arrested and charged with assault in an incident involving his girlfriend in Anchorage, Alaska. Police alleged that Santiago yelled at her, broke down the door, and choked her. The case resulted in a deferred prosecution agreement, and a domestic violence temporary protection order had expired.

Santiago was subsequently scheduled to appear by telephone for sentencing in the domestic violence case in mid-April 2017.

Santiago visited the FBI field office in Anchorage in November 2016 and reported that the U.S. government was controlling his mind and making him watch online videos by the Islamic State of Iraq and the Levant, and that he was being forced to join that group by the CIA. He said that he was hearing voices in his head telling him to commit acts of violence, but he also said that he was in control and did not intend to hurt anyone. The FBI urged him to seek mental health treatment, and notified the local police who detained him and took him to a medical facility for a mental health evaluation. He was later investigated by the FBI, which discovered no links to terrorism or any violation of laws occurring during the Alaska incident. Alaska police took his handgun from him due to the incident, holding it for twenty nine days, but returned it in December because Santiago had not been convicted of a serious crime, involuntarily committed to a mental institution, or adjudicated as mentally defective. 
His weapon was not seized by the FBI, nor was he prevented from checking it for a flight, according to Karen Loeffler, the Alaska U.S. Attorney. She said federal law requires someone to be “adjudicated” as mentally ill before they can be kept from flying with a firearm. “This is not somebody that would have been prohibited, based on the information that they had,” she said of the Anchorage Police Department and the F.B.I. “We’re a country of laws, and they operate within them.”  He had also been dismissed as a security guard at Signal 88 Security on November 15, due to his mental health problems.

Investigation
Santiago was identified by multiple law agencies as the only suspect, having fired a semi-automatic 9mm handgun at people in the baggage claim in Terminal 2. Per court documents and a federal affidavit, Santiago admitted to planning the attack, buying a one-way ticket to the airport and checking a box with a Walther 9mm semiautomatic handgun and the two ammunition magazines he used in the shooting. He stated that he later loaded his handgun in a bathroom at the airport and "shot the first people he encountered" after coming out.

The suspect made a flight reservation to New York City for December 31, 2016, which officials told ABC News might have been his preferred destination. However, he canceled the reservation, and investigators believe that the deployment of a large number of NYPD officers may have been the reason he did so. He booked a one-way ticket to Florida a few days later. Counterterrorism officials in New York meanwhile investigated his plan to visit the city and whether he planned to stay or transfer to another flight. The FBI stated that he appeared to have arrived in the city specifically to carry out the shooting. Investigators found no specific reason why he chose the airport, nor had they determined a motive.

The Qupqugiaq Inn, a motel in midtown Anchorage, was evacuated and searched on the day of the shooting as part of the investigation into the suspect. He had recently been a resident of the Qupqugiaq Inn, which offers monthly rentals. The FBI used a flatbed tow truck to seize the motel's dumpster, which was searched at their Anchorage field office. They conducted interviews with 175 witnesses and people who knew Santiago. According to government officials, Santiago had not been flagged for  significant foreign travel or possible terrorism ties. However, they did not rule out terrorism as a possible motive, with the police investigating whether or not he was a homegrown terrorist or mentally disturbed.

TMZ released a leaked "surveillance video" of the shooting on January 8 which led to the launch of an investigation into the leak. A Broward Sheriff's Office deputy, identified as the individual who leaked the video, was put on paid suspension pending investigation.

Investigators stated that during initial interviews, the suspect said that he had been under "government mind control" and "hearing voices" and that he had been "participating in jihadi chat rooms online" before the attack. Later in April 2017, the investigators stated that no link to terrorism was found. During interviews with police after the attack, Santiago also stated that the gun used in the shooting was the same weapon seized and later returned by the police in Anchorage in 2016.

Prosecution
The day after the shooting, federal officials filed criminal charges against him including performing an act of violence at an international airport, using and carrying a firearm during and in relation to a crime of violence and causing the death of a person through use of a firearm.

A federal public defender was appointed for Santiago since he was unable to pay for a lawyer. He was ordered detained without bond, and was indicted on 22 federal charges on January 26. He pleaded not guilty to all the charges during a court hearing on January 30, 2017.

After his arrest, Santiago was diagnosed with schizophrenia as well as schizoaffective disorder. He initially refused to take psychotropic medication, but later took medications, and his mental condition showed marked improvement. He was deemed legally competent to stand trial. 

Before trial, Santiago's attorneys and federal prosecutors made a plea agreement in which Santiago would plead guilty in return for a sentence of life in prison, avoiding the death penalty, which federal prosecutors had originally considered pursuing.  On May 23, 2018, Santiago pleaded guilty in the shooting. 

On August 17, 2018, Santiago was sentenced to five consecutive life sentences plus 120 years in prison. On September 12, 2018, he was transferred from FDC Miami to FTC Oklahoma City. On September 20, he was then transferred to USP Allenwood given Federal Bureau of Prisons number 15500-104. In June 2021, Santiago-Ruiz was transferred from Allenwood to USP Tucson.

See also

2002 Los Angeles International Airport shooting
 List of rampage killers in the United States

References

2017 in Florida
2017 mass shootings in the United States
Mass shootings in the United States
2017 murders in the United States
Attacks in the United States in 2017
Attacks on airports
History of Broward County, Florida
Crimes in Florida
Deaths by firearm in Florida
Filmed killings
History of Fort Lauderdale, Florida
January 2017 crimes in the United States
Mass murder in 2017
Mass shootings in Florida
Massacres in the United States
Shooting
2017 active shooter incidents in the United States